Jamaican recording artist Buju Banton has released 11 studio albums.

Studio albums

Compilations and remix albums

Charted songs

Notes

References

External links

Discographies of Jamaican artists
Reggae discographies